Tuaran is the capital of the Tuaran District in the West Coast Division of Sabah, Malaysia. Its population was estimated to be around 128,200 in 2019 with half the population consists of ethnic Dusuns, most of the Lotud ethnic subgroup as well of Bajau descent. The remainder is mostly of the Malaysian Chinese community, particularly from the Hakka subgroup and Malay. The town is bordered on three sides by the Tuaran River.

Etymology 
The existence of Tuaran in colonial records can be traced as far back as 1813, in official letters written by Sir Stamford Raffles, the then British Governor of Java, seeking permission to accept the Sultan of Brunei's invitation to deal with piracy issues at 'Jawaran' in the north of Borneo.

'Jawaran' is a corruption of the Malay word tawaran. Tawaran has two meanings; the first meaning is 'fresh water', referring to the importance of the Tuaran area as a source of freshwater for the locality. The second meaning is 'to bargain', which refers to the trading activities which had been taking place in the Tuaran area even before British colonisation commenced in 1884.

Another consideration is Tuaran came from word 'taaran' which mean river by Dusun ethnic.

Cuisine

Bahar wine 
The Dusun Lotud people of Tuaran produce a traditional liquor called bahar (toddy) made from coconut sap mixed with a kind of tree bark known locally as rosok which colours the sap red. Bahar has been scientifically proven to be rich in antioxidants. However, it is extremely pungent and spoils very quickly, usually within one day.

Tuaran mee 

Tuaran mee (Traditional Chinese: 鬥亞蘭面; Hakka: Diu ah lan men), which literally translates as 'Tuaran noodles', is a noodle dish created by the Hakka Chinese community of Tuaran. The noodles are made from a batter consisting of egg yolk and flour. They are fried for five to ten minutes in high heat, causing the bottom part of the noodles to become crunchy. Local vegetables are added during frying. Before Tuaran mee is served, it is usually garnished with slices of sweetened Chinese roast pork (Traditional Chinese: 叉燒; Hakka: cha sau) and fried egg rolls (Traditional Chinese: 春捲; Hakka: chun kien).

Bambangan pickles 
Bambangan pickles is a traditional relish consisting the flesh of the fruit preserved in brine. Traditionally served as a side dish at any meal; often best served with other traditional dish such as Pinasakan

Culture

Tamu 
Every Sunday morning, a tamu (native open-air market) is held in Tuaran town. At the tamu, produce, seafood, traditional food and drinks, handicrafts and other goods from Tuaran and the surrounding villages are bought and sold.

Places of interest 
Borneo Ant House is a mini theme park located at Tuaran-Kota Belud Road. It was open in July 2017 and suitable for family outing.

Chanteek Borneo Indigenous Museum is a mini museum located at Tamparuli Road. It was open in August 2014 and the exhibits are miniature dolls of Barbie size dressed in traditional costumes from Malaysia. It is suitable for educational and for arts and cultural lovers.

Sabandar Cowboy Town is another mini theme park with focus on horse riding activity. It is located near the Sabandar Beach.

Rumah Terbalik or the Upside-down House is an attraction located at Tamparuli Road. It has attracted thousands visitors since its opening in 2012. The major attraction is a Bajau house constructed upside down.

Linangkit Cultural Village (also referred to as LCV) is a cultural attraction which is located in Kampung Selupuh Tuaran. The name Linangkit is a unique traditional Lotud embroidery with patterns usually in color red, orange, etc. to cover up the seams between fabrics which usually used also as a design element in Lotud traditional costumes. The cultural village is the one and only you could go for in order to explore and be exposed to Lotud traditions and also cultures here in Sabah. Moreover, you will save a chance to personally see the actions and visions of how the old folks of Lotud lived in the olden times. Other things you're fortunate to see include handicraft-making demonstrations, traditional food preparations, traditional fish netting, river cruise, firefly watching, and tapioca plucking.

For outdoor activity such as white water rafting, the Kiulu River at the sub-district Kiulu is one of the preferred choice in Sabah for grade I-II rapids.

The 9-Storey Pagoda Ling San is one of the main tourist attraction in Tuaran. Visitor can climb to the top and get a beautiful view of the town.

Tuaran Crocodile Farm is a home for more or less a thousand crocodiles, located just a few kilometres from the town.

Sister Towns

International
 Calabanga, Camarines Sur, Philippines

References

External links 

Towns in Sabah
Tuaran District